Lieutenant-Colonel Robert Edward Archibald Udny-Hamilton, 11th Lord Belhaven and Stenton, CIE, DL (8 April 1871 – 26 October 1950) was a Scottish representative peer and a soldier.

On 15 November 1898, he married Kathleen Gonville Bromhead and they had two children:

Hon. Julia Hamilton (1901–1971), married the 4th Baron Raglan and had issue.
Robert Alexander Benjamin Hamilton, 12th Lord Belhaven and Stenton (1903–1961) married (1) Heather Mildred Carmichael Bell and had issue and (2) Cyrilla Mary Binns, Lady Belhaven and Stenton and had issue.

Kathleen died on 1 December 1935 at their home, Udny Castle, and Lord Belhaven married Sheila de Hauteville Pearson on 25 March 1938. They had two children:

Hon. Margaret de Hauteville Hamilton (b. 3 July 1939), wife of Keith Schellenberg.
Dr. Hon. Victoria Edith Hamilton (b. 17 April 1941)

Belhaven rose to the rank of Lieutenant-Colonel in the service of the Indian Army and fought in the Chitral expedition in 1895, the Tirah Campaign from 1897 to 1898 and the Mesopotamia campaign from 1915 and 1918, where he was mentioned in dispatches.

In 1920, he succeeded his uncle (whose son Ralph, Master of Belhaven, had been killed during the defence of Amiens, 31 March 1918) as Lord Belhaven and Stenton. He was baptised as Robert Edward Archibald Hamilton but, in 1934, he legally changed his name to Robert Edward Archibald Udny-Hamilton.

After suffering ill-health for two years, Udny-Hamilton died at his home, Udny Castle, on 26 October 1950.

References

Lords of Parliament
Scottish representative peers
Scottish soldiers
British Indian Army officers
British military personnel of the Tirah campaign
British military personnel of the Chitral Expedition
Indian Army personnel of World War I
Companions of the Order of the Indian Empire
Recipients of the Kaisar-i-Hind Medal
1871 births
1950 deaths
Deputy Lieutenants of Lanarkshire